CLever Audio Plug-in or CLAP is an open source software architecture, application programming interface and reference implementation suite for audio effects plugins in digital audio workstations. The specification and reference implementation was released in 2022 by u-he and Bitwig.

CLAP was started to overcome technical and legal limitations of the VST plug-in format. CLAP was designed for non-destructive parameter automation, multi-voice envelopes, true MIDI 2.0 support, better multi-core CPU performance and greater ease writing plugins in a non-proprietary licensing framework under the MIT License. CLAP is supported by 7 DAWs and  more than 40 plugin producers who have produced more than 150 CLAP plugins.

See also

 LADSPA and LV2, similar open-source standards

References

External links
 
 
 CLAP Audio Software Database

2022 software
Music software plugin architectures
Software synthesizers
Application programming interfaces
Free audio software